Michael Boogerd (born 28 May 1972) is a Dutch former professional road bicycle racer. He was one of the leaders of a generation of Dutch cyclists in the late 1990s and early 2000s, together with teammate Erik Dekker and female cyclist Leontien van Moorsel.

Career
Boogerd was born in The Hague, and began his professional career in 1994, joining WordPerfect. In 1995 the team changed name to Novell, before Rabobank in 1996 became main sponsor and name for the team. Boogerd stayed with the team his entire career.

His speciality were hilly classics like Liège–Bastogne–Liège, La Flèche Wallonne and the Amstel Gold Race in the Ardennes week and the Lombardian races in the Fall, as well as mountain-stages. He has won two stages in Tour de France (1996, 2002) as well as the Amstel Gold Race and Paris–Nice. He has been Dutch Champion three times, in 1997, 1998 and in 2006. In addition to these major victories, Boogerd scored a large number of podium finishes in his favorite spring classics, which gave him a reputation in the Netherlands of being 2nd or 3rd more often than winning - a notion he dismissed in a 2007 interview looking back at his career.

In the 1998 Tour de France, Boogerd finished 5th overall in the General classification, his highest finish ever in the Tour de France. Boogerd was also fined 1250 Swiss Francs for not wearing his national champion jersey in the prologue of that year. His main result in the 2005 Tour de France was on stage 15, where he finished 4th, 57 seconds behind stage winner, George Hincapie. Also in the Tour de France 2005, he was punished with twenty seconds at Stage 9 of the race. In the 2006 Tour de France, Boogerd's role was to support Rabobank team leader Denis Menchov in the Alps and Pyrenees. He rode exceptionally well helping his team captain to 6th overall and Michael Rasmussen to the Polka Dot jersey.

In the 2007 Tour de France Boogerd rode, again, very well. This time his teammate Michael Rasmussen was the leader of the race until the latter was fired after the last stage in the Pyrenees. On the Thursday before the start of this Tour, Boogerd infused himself with water in the early morning, before the UCI agents could arrive. His hematocrit level namely was 50, "on the edge of the edge". During the Tour, Boogerd and Thomas Dekker used cortisone (Diprofos) under a fake attest every day, and administered eight times 2000 entities of Dynepo.

Boogerd ended his career in 2007, with a 12th place in the World Championship road race in Stuttgart. His planned last race was the 2007 Giro di Lombardia, but a fall in the weeks before made him unable to participate.

After his active career, Boogerd has done freelance promotional activities for Rabobank, and is frequently seen or heard on TV during live coverage of major races, both on Dutch and Belgian television.

Boogerd was appointed team manager of Team Roompot, a UCI Professional Continental cycling team launching in 2015.

Doping

Allegations that Boogerd used performance-enhancing drugs were made since at least 2008, when Bernhard Kohl, who had finished third in the 2008 Tour de France but was stripped of that honor after testing positive for CERA, a variant of EPO accused his manager Stefan Matschiner. Matschiner, in turn, named a number of athletes whom he had supplied with drugs and blood transfusions, including Boogerd (whose name appeared in Matschiner's files). Until early 2013, Boogerd continued to deny. He finally admitted, in a television interview on 6 March 2013 (seen by nearly a million viewers), to having used EPO, blood transfusions and cortisone from 1997 to 2007. In October 2014, he was approached by the Belgian federation, allegedly to offer him to shorten his proposed ban in exchange for naming other dopers and he answered this: "The Belgian federation had the same proposal as the Dutch Doping Authority had. I will be suspended for a long period, or I will have to talk about other people. I refuse to do that. I rather be suspended for life". In January 2016 he received a two-year suspension and his results from 2005 to 2007 were annulled.

Career achievements

Major results

1996
 1st Stage 6 Tour de France
1997
 1st  Road race, National Road Championships
 1st Profronde van Heerlen
1998
 1st  Road race, National Road Championships
 4th Amstel Gold Race
 5th Overall Tour de France
1999
 1st  Overall Paris–Nice
1st Stage 5
 1st Amstel Gold Race
 1st Giro dell'Emilia
 1st Gran Premio Bruno Beghelli
2001
 1st Brabantse Pijl
 1st Setmana Catalana de Ciclisme
 9th Amstel Gold Race
 10th Overall Tour de France
2002
 1st Stage 16 Tour de France
 1st Stage 6 Ronde van Nederland
 1st Peperbus Profspektakel
 3rd Amstel Gold Race
2003
 1st Brabantse Pijl
 2nd Amstel Gold Race
2004
 2nd Amstel Gold Race

2005
 2nd Amstel Gold Race
 3rd Liège–Bastogne–Liège
 6th Overall Tour de Pologne
 7th Overall Tour of the Basque Country
2006
 1st  Road race, National Road Championships
 1st Peperbus Profspektakel
 3rd Amstel Gold Race
 4th Züri–Metzgete
 5th Overall Tirreno–Adriatico
 5th Liège–Bastogne–Liège
 8th Giro di Lombardia
2007
 1st Peperbus Profspektakel

Grand Tour general classification results timeline

See also
 List of Dutch Olympic cyclists

References

External links

 
 
 

1972 births
Cyclists at the 2004 Summer Olympics
Doping cases in cycling
Dutch male cyclists
Dutch sportspeople in doping cases
Dutch Tour de France stage winners
Olympic cyclists of the Netherlands
Living people
Cyclists from The Hague
UCI Road World Championships cyclists for the Netherlands